Taïkan Jyoji is the representative for Europe of the Rinzai school of Zen (Myôshin-ji branch, Kyoto). He was officially installed in this function by Yamada Mumon Rôshi in 1976.

Director of the "Green Cliff" zen center 

In 1989, Taïkan Jyoji was given the title of Kaikyo-shi (Founding Master) for Europe. Then he founded and has directed since his return of Japan the "Green Cliff" Zen Center (in French : "La Falaise Verte"). The "Green Cliff" zen center is located in the Middle South of France, in Ardèche, near the village of Saint Laurent du Pape. The "Green Cliff" center, also named the "Shobo-ji Temple" (Temple of the Authentic Dharma), is directly linked with the Myoshin-ji headtemple. 
The "Green Cliff" center is composed of a Zendo, the meditation place, and a kyūdō dōjō, where the Japanese art of archery can be practiced.
In June 2010, the Zendo has been consacred by a Japanese delegation of temple's masters led by Kancho Taïtsu Roshi, head of Myoshin-Ji.
In March 2017, Taïkan Jyoji has been honored by the Japanese Government. He has been receiving a price for his contribution to promote the Japanese culture.

Bibliography 

 La source du vide, Éditions Le Courrier du Livre, Paris,1989
 Zen et zazen, Éditions Le Courrier du Livre, Paris, 1991
 Au coeur du Zen,Éditions Le Courrier du Livre, Paris, 1996
 Exhortations zen, Éditions Le Courrier du Livre, Paris, 1996
 Itinéraire d'un maître zen venu d'Occident, Éditions Almora, Paris, réédité 2008
 L'art du kôan zen, Éditions Albin Michel Spiritualité, Paris, 2001
 Zen au fil des jours, Éditions Le Courrier du Livre, Paris, 2006
 Un jour - une vie (Tome 1), Éditions Almora, Paris, 2011
 Un jour - une vie (Tome 2), Éditions Almora, Paris, 2012
 Un jour - une vie (Tome 3), Éditions Almora, Paris, 2015
 Correspondence d'un maître Zen, Éditions Almora, Paris, 2014
 Kyudo, tir à l'arc zen, Éditions Le Courrier du Livre, Paris, 2014
 Les Saveurs du Zen, (Cookbook in collaboration with Françoise Dye), Éditions Almora, Paris, 2009

References

External links 
 The Green Cliff (La Falaise Verte)
 Zoom on Taïkan Jyoji toward the French buddhist channel "Voix Bouddhistes" 
Rinzai Zen and its European delegate on the French Buddhist University 
 Taïkan Jyoji on Buddhachannel 
 Architectural project of the Green Cliff Zendo 
Video of the French TV show "Buddhist Wisdom". Taïkan Jyoji comment the calligraphy "Everyday is a good day"

Wikipedia Category 

Buddhism

Zen

Rinzai

Green Cliff

Living people
Year of birth missing (living people)